Notton and Royston railway station was a railway station that served the village of Royston, South Yorkshire, England. It was situated on the Barnsley Coal Railway between Staincross and Mapplewell and Ryhill.

The first section of the line to open was that from Stairfoot to Applehaigh (just north of Notton and Royston station) in 1870 so that Rosa Colliery could be served. The station opened, along with two others on the line, on 1 September 1882, and was closed to passengers by the LNER on 22 September 1930.

It had flanking platforms and simple buildings to house all the facilities constructed in wood.

References 

 Dow, George. "Great Central" Vol 2. (Dominion of Watkin)(1962), Loco. Publishing Co., London.

External links
 Notton and Royston station on navigable O. S. map

Disused railway stations in Barnsley
Former Great Central Railway stations
Railway stations in Great Britain opened in 1882
Railway stations in Great Britain closed in 1930